Audrey Fildes (24 November 1922, Bromborough, Cheshire, England –  13 September 1997, Toronto, Ontario, Canada) was a British actress whose first film credit was the 1947 production While I Live. In 1949, she played the role of Louis Mazzini's mother, who was ostracised by her aristocratic family, in the film Kind Hearts and Coronets.

Granddaughter of Victorian painter, Sir Luke Fildes R.A. and Welsh Sculptor Sir William Goscombe-John R.A., and son of British Olympian (Épée) Luke Val Fildes, Audrey showed keen interest in acting while a student at Hayes Court School. She later related that, while at Hayes Court, she was directed in a performance of The Merchant of Venice by Alec Guinness. At the performance, he brought Peggy Ashcroft backstage and introduced Audrey to her as "my Portia". During her 20s she enjoyed an active acting career, appearing as Sonia in the celebrated production of Dostoyevsky's Crime and Punishment with John Gielgud at the New Theatre in 1946 and as Diana in Jean Anouilh's Ring Round the Moon (1950), directed by Peter Brook and co-starring Paul Scofield.

She married a Canadian design consultant in 1955, and moved to Ottawa. They had two sons Paul and Nicholas before separating, following which Audrey returned to England to bring up her sons. In the early 1970s Audrey trained for a second career as a gilder and restorer at the City and Guilds of London School. In 1976 she returned to Canada, settling in Toronto. Her gilding and restoration clients included the Government of Ontario and pieces of her work remain at Queen's Park, the Provincial Parliament. She was a member of the William Morris Society of Canada.

References

External links

1922 births
1997 deaths
English film actresses
Actresses from Liverpool
20th-century English actresses
British comedy actresses
British emigrants to Canada